Mazraeh (also Romanized as Mazra‘eh) is a village in Khvoresh Rostam-e Shomali Rural District, Khvoresh Rostam District, Khalkhal County, Ardabil Province, northwestern Iran.

It is located on the Qizil Üzan river, in the Alborz (Elburz) mountain range.

At the 2006 census, its population was 283, in 63 families.

See also

References 

Towns and villages in Khalkhal County
Settled areas of Elburz